London Buses route 240 is a Transport for London contracted bus route in London, England. Running between Golders Green and Edgware stations, it is operated by Metroline.

History

Route 240 was introduced in the 1930s between Golders Green and Edgware stations and replaced the former London General Omnibus Company route 104. The only single-decker version of the LS (London Six) type bus ran on route 240.

Upon being re-tendered, the route was retained by Metroline with a new contract commencing on 30 April 2005.

Route 240 was retained by Metroline on 18 August 2011.

Current route
Route 240 operates via these primary locations:
Golders Green station bus station  
Hendon The Bell
Mill Hill East station  
Mill Hill Three Hammers Pub
Mill Hill Broadway station 
Edgware Hale Lane
Edgware station bus station

References

External links

Bus routes in London
Transport in the London Borough of Barnet